Martin Fournier (born September 10, 1954) is a Canadian historian and writer. He is most noted as the author of The Adventures of Radisson, a series of young adult historical novels centred on the adventures and explorations of 17th-century fur trader Pierre-Esprit Radisson.

L'enfer ne brûle pas, the first novel in the Radisson series, was the winner of the Governor General's Award for French-language children's literature at the 2011 Governor General's Awards. Later novels in the series included Sauver les français (2014), L'année des surhommes (2016) and Le castor ou la vie (2021). The first three novels in the series have also been translated into English by Peter McCambridge, as Hell Never Burns (2012), Back to the New World (2015) and The Incredible Escape (2016).

A former professor of history at the Université du Québec à Rimouski, he has also published an academic biography of Radisson, Pierre-Esprit Radisson 1636-1710. Aventurier et commerçant (2001), as well as Jean Mauvide, de chirurgien à seigneur de l'île d'Orléans au XVIIIe siècle (2004).

References

1954 births
Living people
20th-century Canadian historians
21st-century Canadian historians
21st-century Canadian non-fiction writers
21st-century Canadian novelists
21st-century Canadian male writers
Canadian male non-fiction writers
Canadian male novelists
Canadian non-fiction writers in French
Canadian novelists in French
Canadian historical novelists
Canadian writers of young adult literature
French Quebecers
Academic staff of the Université du Québec
Writers from Quebec
Governor General's Award-winning children's writers